Cynthia ("Cindy") Mae Bremser–Whitmore (born May 5, 1953, in Milwaukee) is a retired middle distance runner from the United States. She finished fourth in the 3,000 metres at the 1984 Summer Olympics. She won the silver medal in the 1,500 metres at the 1983 Pan American Games.

International competitions

References

 ARRS
 Profile
 USA Olympic Team

1953 births
Living people
American female long-distance runners
American female middle-distance runners
Athletes (track and field) at the 1984 Summer Olympics
Olympic track and field athletes of the United States
Athletes (track and field) at the 1975 Pan American Games
Athletes (track and field) at the 1983 Pan American Games
Pan American Games silver medalists for the United States
World Athletics Championships athletes for the United States
Track and field athletes from Milwaukee
Pan American Games medalists in athletics (track and field)
Goodwill Games medalists in athletics
Competitors at the 1986 Goodwill Games
Medalists at the 1983 Pan American Games
20th-century American women
People from Mishicot, Wisconsin